The Canary Islands large white (Pieris cheiranthi) is a species of butterfly in the family Pieridae. It is endemic to the Canary Islands (Spain).

Description
Very similar to Pieris brassicae, but the black discal patches are much larger and fused together. It reaches a size of 57 to 66 millimeters.

Distribution
The Canary white is widespread on La Palma, in Tenerife it is limited to the northern coastal areas. The last records from La Gomera dates back to 1975 and the species is probably extinct on that island. There are also unconfirmed reports from Gran Canaria.

Subspecies
Pieris cheiranthi cheiranthi (Hübner, 1808)
Pieris cheiranthi benchoavensis Pinker, 1969, La Palma (Canary Islands)

Habitat
The Canary White inhabits wet and moist shady gorges in laurel forests . It also occurs outside the laurel forest zone, for example, wet cliffs with a corresponding microclimate.

Biology
The female lays the eggs on the underside of leaves in piles of 5 to 50 . The larvae have a light green base color and are dotted black. At the top and sides they show a light yellow stripe. Among the food plants of the caterpillars are include Canary silverwort (Lobularia canariensis) and nasturtium ( Tropaeolum majus ). Crambe strigosa, endemic to the Canary Islands, seems to be the only natural food plant.
The species flies in seven to eight consecutive generations, which partially overlap. The imago occurs throughout the year, a diapause is not known.

Threats
Threatened by habitat loss.

References

M. Wiemers, 1995 The butterflies of the Canary Islands. A survey of their distribution, biology and ecology (Lepidoptera: Papilionoidea and Hesperioidea). First part. Linneana Belgica 1995 15:63-86

External links 
 
 

cheiranthi
Insects of the Canary Islands
Butterflies of Africa
Vulnerable animals
Vulnerable biota of Africa
Butterflies described in 1808
Taxonomy articles created by Polbot
Taxa named by Jacob Hübner